Marineau is a surname. Notable people with the surname include:

Dennis Marineau (born 1962), Canadian bobsledder
Mathieu Marineau (born 1990), Canadian male weightlifter
Michèle Marineau (born 1955), Canadian writer and translator

See also
Guiles v. Marineau, 461 F.3d 320 (2d. Cir. 2006)
Marin (disambiguation)
Marina
Marinu